Fran Bow is a graphic adventure game, with psychological horror elements, developed and produced by Killmonday Games, a Swedish indie game studio. Released in 2015 for PC and in 2016 for mobile.

Gameplay
Similar to other adventure games, the gameplay involves seeking various objects in the game world in order to combine and use them to solve puzzles, and speaking with non-player characters to learn more about the world and how to progress. In one scene, the player controls the protagonist's cat. Additionally, a small portion of Fran Bow consists of minigames situated within the broader narrative that present more complex logical challenges.

Plot
Set in 1944, the game tells the story of Fran, a ten-year-old girl struggling with mental illness after witnessing the murder of her parents. She is then found alone in the woods and admitted to Oswald Asylum, separating Fran from her black cat and only friend, Mr. Midnight. Under the care of psychiatrist Dr. Marcel Deern, Fran is administered pills. The pills cause vivid hallucinations of a phantasmagoric parallel universe, filling Oswald Asylum with smears of blood, mysterious messages, grisly torture, human subject research in psychiatry and neurology, and otherworldly shadow beings. Driven to escape her imprisonment, find her cat, and return home, Fran escapes and flees into a nocturnal forest in which she encounters ghostly nature spirits. Fran then finds herself and Mr. Midnight trapped together in a haunted house that belongs to conjoined twins named Clara and Mia Buhalmet. Fran eventually escapes and attempts to cross a bridge of roots, which frays and collapses. She awakens to discover that she has been transformed into a tree in a brighter world called Ithersta, a land where vegetables, insects, pine cones, and roots live in harmony. There she meets Palontras who helps her return home. After departing Ithersta, Fran meets Itward, a giant skeletal creature. She discovers that it was Itward who had helped her in her search for Mr. Midnight. Itward tries to take Fran back home in his flying machine.

The flying machine crashes, however, and Fran Bow and Itward are separated. Fran awakens near her home where she is taken away by Dr. Deern. After visiting Fran's parents grave, Remor, a demonic creature that has pursued Fran throughout the game, captures them. She is trapped in a hell-like dimension, ruled by Remor's mother, Mabuka. It is revealed Fran's aunt Grace and Dr. Oswald, who experimented on Grace and Fran's mother, had Remor possess Fran to murder her parents believing Fran's suffering is key to his experiment. After Oswald shoots her, Itward and Palontras come to save Fran, killing Grace and Oswald. After being revived, Fran, Mr. Midnight, Itward, and Palontras fly away with Fran resolving to be happy.

Premise
Throughout the game, Fran and other characters grapple with psychological trauma, survive the abuse of parents and doctors, and learn what it means to live amongst many types of beings and spirits.

Development
Fran Bow was developed by Swedish studio Killmonday Games, composed of Natalia Martinsson (née Figueroa) and Isak Martinsson. The plot of the game includes autobiographical elements from Natalia's life, and she described the process of creating the game as therapeutic. The game was part-funded through an Indiegogo crowdfunding campaign, raising $28,295 in August 2013. The game was released for desktop platforms in 2015, and mobile versions followed in 2016.

Reception

Fran Bow sold 10,000 copies in its first month. The game received a score of 70/100 on reviews aggregation website Metacritic, indicating a mixed response. Adam Smith, writing at Rock, Paper, Shotgun, gave the game a positive review, describing it as a game that "sits alongside Wonderland and Oz – imaginative, strange, unsettling, intelligent and charged with a rare and beautiful sense of hope". Smith felt however, that some plot threads were not satisfactorily concluded. Joel Couture, in an article for Gamasutra, used Fran Bow to discuss the merits of an ambiguous ending; Figueroa responded that she preferred to "give the answers in a metaphorical way", allowing players to interpret those signals through their own experiences.

The Sorrowvirus: A Faceless Short Story
Fran Bow also appears in The Sorrowvirus: A Faceless Short Story as an animate doll, used with the permission of Killmonday Games. Fran Bow in The Sorrowvirus: A Faceless Short Story holds no canonical connection to its parent title and is instead a guest-star in a separate video game universe.

References

External links
Official website

2015 video games
Android (operating system) games
Horror video games
Indiegogo projects
IOS games
Linux games
MacOS games
Point-and-click adventure games
Video games developed in Sweden
Video games featuring female protagonists
Video games set in psychiatric hospitals
Video games set in the 1940s
Windows games
Single-player video games
GameMaker Studio games
Gothic video games